Kang Ji-sub (born Kim Young-sub on February 6, 1981) is a South Korean actor. He began acting in 2005 in Dear Heaven, and went on to star in television melodramas such as Two Wives (2009), The Empress (2011), and Two Women's Room (2013). Kang made his big-screen debut in 2014 with The Plan, a thriller about loan sharks.

Filmography

Television series

Film

Variety show

Awards and nominations

References

External links
 
  
 Kang Ji-sub at Run Entertainment 
 Kang Ji-sub Fan Cafe at Daum 

1981 births
Living people
21st-century South Korean male actors
South Korean male television actors
South Korean male film actors
People from Busan